The 2001 Mobiline Phone Pals season was the 12th season of the franchise in the Philippine Basketball Association (PBA). The team became known as Talk 'N Text Phone Pals beginning the Governor's Cup.

Draft picks

Transactions

Occurrences
Asi Taulava return to the team on June 22 upon being cleared to play again in the PBA and along with their returning import Todd Bernard, who came in to replaced Jerod Ward.

Mobiline was renamed Talk 'N Text Phone Pals starting the Governor's Cup, when Smart Communications absorbed the operations of Pilipino Telephone Corporation.

Roster

 Team Manager: Frankie Lim

Elimination round

Games won

References

TNT Tropang Giga seasons
Talk